Scavenger receptor may refer to:

Scavenger receptor (immunology)
Scavenger receptor (endocrinology)